The 1993 Buffalo Bulls football team represented the University at Buffalo in the 1993 NCAA Division I-AA football season. The Bulls offense scored 190 points while the defense allowed 359 points.

Schedule

References

Buffalo
Buffalo Bulls football seasons
Buffalo Bulls football